Ellen Hollman (born April 1, 1983) is an American actress.

Biography
Hollman was born in Detroit, Michigan, the oldest of four siblings. She eventually moved to Troy, Michigan, and was an all-star track runner, holding the Michigan state record for the women's long jump (17.5 ft). Angelica Floyd holds the current Michigan state record for the womens' long jump at 19.375 feet, which was set in 2017. 

In 2008, Hollman became the CEO and founder of a non-profit charity called Visual Impact Now. The celebrity hosts for the organization have included stars such as Chris Pine, Zoe Saldana, January Jones and Robert Luketic. Her organization has conducted various eye clinics in Los Angeles, providing over 6,000 children with eyeglasses. 

She made her television debut on an episode of Malcolm in the Middle in 2005, before going on to appear as Frankie Muniz's fiancee on an episode of Criminal Minds in 2007. In the fourth season of The O.C. she appeared as young Kirsten Nichol in a flashback. In 2006, Hollman made her film debut in Road House 2, where she played the role of Beau. Hollman worked on two big-screen projects which debuted in 2008, Fling with Brandon Routh, and Asylum with Sarah Roemer. She was cast as a new series regular on Spartacus: Vengeance (premiered in January 2012) as Saxa, a Germanic warrior who is an antagonist to Mira (Katrina Law) and love interest for Gannicus (Dustin Clare) but eventually sides with Spartacus during his slave rebellion, and reprised the role in the fourth and final season of Spartacus (premiered on January 25, 2013). She recently recurred on AMC Into The Badlands as Regent Warrior Zypher.

Hollman was cast in The Matrix Resurrections, released in 2021.

Personal life
Hollman is trained in jiu-jitsu and earned her "Women Empowered" Pink belt as well as "Combatives" Blue Belt from the Gracie Academy, where her The Scorpion King 4: Quest for Power co-star Eve Torres (wife of Rener Gracie, a chief instructor at the academy) is also a member. In December 2015, Hollman announced she was engaged to her Spartacus: Vengeance co-star Stephen Dunlevy, and the two married in August 2016.

Filmography

Film

Television

Web series

References

External links
 Official fansite
 

1983 births
American film actresses
American television actresses
Living people
Actresses from Detroit
21st-century American actresses